Polyhexanide (polyhexamethylene biguanide, PHMB) is a polymer used as a disinfectant and antiseptic. In dermatological use, it is spelled polihexanide (INN) and sold under the names Lavasept, Serasept, Prontosan, and Omnicide. PHMB has been shown to be effective against Pseudomonas aeruginosa, Staphylococcus aureus, Escherichia coli, Candida albicans, Aspergillus brasiliensis, enterococci, and Klebsiella pneumoniae.

Products containing PHMB are used for inter-operative irrigation, pre- and post-surgery skin and mucous membrane disinfection, post-operative dressings, surgical and non-surgical wound dressings, surgical bath/hydrotherapy, chronic wounds like diabetic foot ulcer and burn wound management, routine antisepsis during minor incisions, catheterization, first aid, surface disinfection, and linen disinfection. PHMB eye drops have been used as a treatment for eyes affected by Acanthamoeba keratitis.

It is sold as a swimming pool and spa disinfectant in place of chlorine or bromine based products under the name Baquacil. 

PHMB is also used as an ingredient in some contact lens cleaning products, cosmetics, personal deodorants and some veterinary products. It is also used to treat clothing (Purista), purportedly to prevent the development of unpleasant odors.

The PHMB hydrochloride salt (solution) is used in the majority of formulations.

Safety
In 2011, Polyhexamethylenbiguanide was classified as category 2 carcinogen by the European Chemical Agency, but it is still allowed in cosmetics in small quantities if exposure by inhalation is impossible.

In 2018, the European Commission decided to ban the use of PHMB as a preservative. It is currently used as an algaecide and disinfectant.

See also
 Polyaminopropyl biguanide

References

Antiseptics and disinfectants
Biguanides
Polymers